Nisibis may refer to :

 the Classic Greek name of Nusaybin (or Nizib), a presently Asian Turkish city on the Syrian border, which was an archbishopric in Mesopotamia Prima
 its various Catholic successor sees, all titular archbishoprics :
 Nisibis of the Romans    (Latin Church)
 Nisibis of the Armenians (Armenian Catholic Church)
 Nisibis of the Chaldeans (Chaldean Catholic Church)
 Nisibis of the Maronites (Maronite Church)
 the former Ecclesiastical province of Nisibis of the Church of the East

See also 
 Syriac Catholic Archeparchy of Hassaké–Nisibi (where Nisibis is merely an added second title)